Byrd is an irregular lunar impact crater that is located near the north pole of the Moon. The north rim of Byrd is nearly connected to the crater Peary, a formation that is adjacent to the pole. The smaller crater Gioja is attached to the remains of the southwest rim.

The rim of Byrd is worn and eroded, with sections distorted by intruding crater rims along the perimeter. As a result, the crater interior is longer in the north–south direction than it is wide. There is a gap in the western rim, and the southern rim is now little more than a low ridge on the surface.

Some time after the original impact the crater interior was covered in lava flows, leaving a nearly flat surface that is marked only by tiny craterlets. There is no central peak at the midpoint of the interior, and no ridges of significance.

Satellite craters
By convention these features are identified on lunar maps by placing the letter on the side of the crater midpoint that is closest to Byrd.

References

External links

 LAC-1 area - Map of northern lunar pole

Impact craters on the Moon